The Cesi family is an Italian noble family which belonged to the high aristocracy of Rome and the Papal States.

Origins 

The Cesi family takes its surname from Cesi. 
The fieldom of Cesi was originally part of the Lombard Duchy of Spoleto.
The Cesi fief was of the Arnolfi family, the chief seat of the Terre Arnolfe. The Arnolfi family claimed descent from the Lombard Arnulf, vassal of Duke of Spoleto. The duchy was then annexed to the Papal States.
It comes from the Latin word caesi and the Latin verb caedere. Contraction of the Lombard toponym Cesina, which indicated a coppice wood or a place cleared of woodland.

History 

According to the "Relation de Rome" of the French Ambassador to the court of Urban VIII, Amayden, the Cesi family was located in Umbria (with its main seat the castle of Cesi). Antonio Chitani of Cesi, the chief of the family, and his wife Angela Ternabili were slaughtered in the Church of St. Anthony Abbot, in the castle of Cesi, on the feast day of the saint, with all their relatives. Only their son Pietro  (1422-1477), still in swaddling clothes, escaped the massacre. Pietro moved to Rome and  later became a very famous consistory lawyer to the point of obtaining the office of podestà of Perugia first and then that of senator in Rome. The three sons born to Pietro, Bartolomeo, Pierdonato, and Angelo, respectively, originated three branches of the family.

The last of Pietro's sons, Angelo or Agnolo, married Franceschina Cardoli, a descendant on his mother's side of the famous condottiero Gattamelata; he himself was a very distinguished personage of his time, becoming a jurisconsult, professor of the Roman Archiginnassio, consistorial lawyer and senator like his father until he was noticed by Pope Julius II, who appointed him first apostolic secretary and then auditor of the apostolic chamber. He was also a splendid patron, commissioning Michelangelo to build the family chapel in the church of Santa Maria della Pace in Rome. His son, Maximilian Octavius, was bishop of Cervia, while two of his other sons, Federico and Paolo Emilio, were both cardinals.

Giangiacomo, Angelo's son, was decemvir at Todi and was noble of Terni. He took part in the siege of Florence in 1530, also distinguishing himself as a condottiero. Through his wife, Isabella Liviani d'Alviano, who bequeathed him his father's fiefdom, he was able to make an exchange with Pierluigi Farnese, receiving in exchange the fiefs of Acquasparta and Portaria.

Giangiacomo's son, Angelo, followed in his father's footsteps and was also a decemvir at Todi and a nobleman at Terni, embarking like his parent on a military career on behalf of the Church State. In 1569, during the reign of Pius V, he commanded a military expeditionary force in France to bring aid to Charles IX against the Huguenots. He distinguished himself in the capture of Poitiers where he later died in 1570. He had a palace in Rome in via della Maschera d'oro that later became the seat of his household and erected a grand mausoleum to his uncle, Cardinal Federico Cesi, in the church of Santa Maria Maggiore.

His sons were Bartolomeo, who later became archbishop of Conza, bishop of Tivoli and cardinal, and Federico, who first assumed the title of marquis of Monticelli. In favor of the latter, Pope Sixtus V erected the fiefdom of Acquasparta into a duchy in 1588, while Pope Paul V in 1613 granted him the principality over the marquisates of San Polo dei Cavalieri and Sant'Angelo. The latter married Princess Olimpia Orsini.

Federico (1562-1630), was the eldest son of the former and 2nd Duke of Acquasparta. His brother Firmino, became bishop of Rimini. His son, founder of the Accademia dei Lincei, would be known as Federico the Lyncean and would be one of the greatest scholars of the 17th century. He married Princess Artemisia Colonna in first marriage and Marchesa Isabella Salviati in second marriage.

The family grew and prospered until the second half of the 17th century when it sold most of its property to the Borghese family. At this point the branch of the dukes of Acquasparta was succeeded by the one originated by Bartolomeo with Giacomo di Giuseppe who in 1804 and then with his son, Luigi in 1821.

The Pierdonato branch ruled with the title of marquis and duke in several fiefs in the Sabina area, dying out in 1657 with the death of Francesco Maria Cesi, duke of Ceri and Selci, titles that returned to the main branch of the lineage.

Family tree

Notable members

Cesi cardinals
 Paolo Emilio Cesi (1481–1537)
 Federico Cesi (1500–1565), younger brother of Cardinal Paolo Emilio Cesi.
 Pier Donato Cesi (1521–1586), seniore (senior) 
 Pier Donato Cesi (1583–1656), iuniore (junior)
 Bartolomeo Cesi (1566–1621)

Cesi bishops
 Bartolomeo Cesi (died 1537), Bishop of Narni until his death in 1537.

Cesi nobles

Princes of San Polo and Sant'Angelo (1613-1670), Dukes of Acquasparta and Marquesses of Monticelli (1588)
 Federico I Cesi (1562–1630), I prince of San Polo and Sant'Angelo, I duke of Acquasparta, I marquis of Monticelli.
 Federico II Cesi (1585-1630), II prince of San Polo and Sant'Angelo, II duke of Acquasparta, II marquis of Monticelli, scientist, naturalist and founder of the Accademia dei Lincei.
 Giovanni Cesi (died 1656), III prince of San Polo and Sant'Angelo, III duke of Acquasparta, III marquis of Monticelli.
 Federico III Cesi (died 1666), IV prince of San Polo and Sant'Angelo, IV duke of Acquasparta, IV marquis of Monticelli
 Giuseppe Angelo Cesi (died 1705), V prince of San Polo and Sant'Angelo, V duke of Acquasparta, V marquis of Monticelli. The fiefdom of San Polo and Sant'Angelo is sold with the relative title to the Borghese princes; the other titles of duke and marquis remain active.
 Federico IV Pierdonato Cesi (died 1762), VI duke of Acquasparta, VI marquis of Monticelli.
 Carlo Federico Cesi (died 1774), VII duke of Acquasparta, VII marquis of Monticelli.
 Federico V Cesi (1766–1799), VIII duke of Acquasparta, VIII marquis of Monticelli.
 Giacomo Cesi (died 1821), IX duke of Acquasparta, IX marquis of Monticelli.
 Luigi Cesi, X duke of Acquasparta, X marquis of Monticelli.
 Federico VI Cesi, XI duke of Acquasparta, XI marquis of Monticelli.
 Gerberto, XII duke of Acquasparta, XII marquis of Monticelli.
 Elvira, duchess of Acquasparta, married Marquis Gaspare Cittadini and gave rise to the Cittadini-Cesi lineage.

Dukes of Selci (1596) and of Ceri (c. 1612)
 Paolo Emilio Cesi (d. 1611), II duke of Selci (title acquired from the Orsini)
 Andrea Cesi (d. 1626), I duke of Ceri, III duke of Selci
 Francesco Maria Cesi (d. 1657), II duke of Ceri, IV duke of Selci. Upon his death, the title of Duke of Selci passed to the main family branch, while that of Duke of Ceri passed to the Borromeo family.

Matrimonial alliances I Cesi. Storia e Cronistoria di una Famiglia Nobile di AcquaspartaFederico Cesi e la fondazione dell'Accademia dei LinceiI Testamenti dei Cardinali: Pietro Donato Cesi (1583-1656) Il Palazzo Cesi di Acquasparta e la Rivoluzione Scientifica Lincea 

Don Giangiacomo (+1455)
= Donna Isabella d'Alviano, daughter of Count Bartolomeo d'Alviano and Pentesilea Baglioni dei Counts of Spello and Bettona

Don Angelo (1542-1570) = Donna Beatrice Caetani, daughter of Don Bonifazio I 4°  Duke of Sermoneta  and of Caterina Pio di Savoia dei  Princes of Carpi 

Don Federico I (1562-1630) = Donna Olimpia Orsini, daughter of Giovanni 2°  Marquis of Lamentana and Porzia dei  Counts dell'Anguillara

Don Federico II (1585-1630): 
= Donna Artemisia Colonna, daughter of Don Francesco Prince of Palestrina and Donna Ersilia Sforza dei  Counts of Santa Fiora
= Donna Isabella Salviati, daughter of Lorenzo Marquis of Giuliano and Donna Maddalena Strozzi dei Princes of Forano

Donna Olimpia (1618)
= Ludovico Lante della Rovere Marquis of Massa Luense
= Paolo Sforza Marquis of Proceno

Donna Caterina (1637)
= Giulio Della Rovere dei  Marquis of San Lorenzo

Paolo Emilio (+1611)
= Porzia dell’Anguillara, daughter and heiress of Giampaolo dei Counts dell’Anguillara and Margherita Orsini dei  Princes of Taranto
= Costanza degli Atti

Don Andrea (+1626)
= Donna Cornelia Orsini, daughter of Don Virginio Duke of San Gemini and Donna Giovanna Caetani dei Dukes of Sermoneta, already widow of Don Roberto Altemps Duke of Gallese

Don Francesco Maria (+1657)
= Giulia Pico Princess of Mirandola, daughter of Prince Alessandro Pico della Mirandola and Laura d’Este Princess of Modena and Reggio
= Donna Anna Caterina Aldobrandini, daughter of Don Pietro Duke of Carpineto and Donna Carlotta Savelli dei  Princes of Albano 

Donna Maria 
= Don Giovanni Angelo d’Altemps, Duke of Gallese

Don Giovanni (+1656)
= Giulia Veronica Ravignani Sforza Manzuoli, daughter of Francesco Maria Count of Bagnolo, Todorano, Valdeponte, Corano, Ripoli, Confinente, Lagaro, Carpineta, Vado and Brigadello

Donna Isabella (1676-1753)
= Don Francesco Ruspoli, Prince of Cerveteri 

Romolo (+1573)
= Timotea Orsini dei  Dukes of San Gemini
= Venere D'Evoli dei  Princes of Castroprignano

Donna Lucrezia (1577+)
= Giulio Landi Prince of Val di Taro

Donna Isabella
= Duke Ludovico Lante Montefeltro Della Rovere, Marquis of Massa Luense

Don Giuseppe Angelo (+1705)
= Donna Giacinta Conti, daughter of Don Carlo Duke of Poli and Guadagnolo and Donna Isabella Muti dei Dukes of Rignano 

Don Federico Pierdonato (+1762)
= Donna Silvia Maria Teresa Muti, daughter of Don Giacomo Duke of Rignano and Virginia Caffarelli, already widow of Don Taddeo Barberini, Prince of Palestrina

Don Carlo Federico (+1774)
= Maria Vittoria Spada, daughter of Marquis Clemente of Caste Viscardo and Maria dei Counts Rocci

Don Federico (+1771)
= Maria Anna Massimo, daughter of Marquis Emilio Massimo and Maria dei  Counts Bernardini Ferretti, who became heiress to the Cesi's Dukes of Rignano title, and transmitted it to her nephews from the Massimo family 
 
Don Federico (+1799)
= Matilde Malatesta, daughter of Felice Antonio Count of Sogliano 

Donna Nicolosa (1550+)
= Onofrio Santacroce, Duke of San Gemini

Pietro Donato detto Pierdonato (+1504)
= Lucrezia degli Atti

Paolo Emilio (+1611)
= Porzia dell’Anguillara, daughter and heiress of Giampaolo Count dell’Anguillara and Margherita Orsini dei Princes di Taranto
= Costanza degli Atti

Donna Anna Maria (+1647)
= Don Michele Damasceni Peretti, Prince of Venafro

Don Marcantonio
= Paola Savelli dei  Princes of Albano, daughter of Tullio Savelli and Violante Orsini 

Don Federico (+ 1620)
= Olimpia Orsini, daughter of Giordano Orsini Duke of San Gemini
 
Francesco (+1646)
= Margherita Ravignani Sforza Manzuoli, daughter of Francesco Maria Count of Bagnolo, Todorano, Valdeponte, Corano, Ripoli, Confiente, Lagaro, Carpineta, Vado and Brigadello

Giovanni (+ 1531)
= Camilla Spada dei Marquis of Gerbeuville

References

Bibliography

Italian families
Italian noble families
History of Italy
History of Umbria
Italian culture
Cesi family